Fasciculancylistes fasciculatus is a species of beetle in the family Cerambycidae, and the only species in the genus Fasciculancylistes. It was described by Breuning in 1965.

References

Acanthocinini
Beetles described in 1965
Monotypic Cerambycidae genera
Taxa named by Stephan von Breuning (entomologist)